Ici Radio-Canada Télé operates as a Canadian French language television network owned by the Canadian Broadcasting Corporation (known in French as Société Radio-Canada) made up of thirteen owned-and-operated stations and seven private affiliates. This is a table listing of Radio-Canada affiliates, with stations owned by Radio-Canada separated from privately owned affiliates, and arranged by market. This article also includes former self-supporting stations currently operating as rebroadcasters of regional affiliates, stations no longer affiliated with Télévision de Radio-Canada and stations purchased by the CBC that formerly operated as private Radio-Canada affiliates.
 
The station's advertised channel number follows the call letters; in most cases, this is their over-the-air broadcast frequency. The number in parentheses which follows a virtual channel number is the station's actual digital channel number, digital channels allocated for future use listed in parentheses are italicized.

Note:
 Two boldface asterisks appearing following a station's call letters (**) indicate a Radio-Canada station that was built and signed-on by the Canadian Broadcasting Corporation.

Ici Radio-Canada Télé owned-and-operated stations

Former Radio-Canada-owned self-supporting stations

Former affiliates

Notes:
1 ) Also affiliated with the English CBC network, 1959-1968;
2 ) Also affiliated with the English CBC network, 1954-1957;
3 ) Also affiliated with the English CBC network, 1957-1962;
4 ) Affiliated with both CBC and Radio-Canada, 1956-1974; now TVA affiliate.
5 ) Affiliated with both CBC and Radio-Canada, 1956 until CBFOT (now CBLFT-3) established, which rebroadcasts CBLFT Toronto;

Affiliates later purchased by Radio-Canada

See also
List of CBC television stations for stations affiliated with or owned by the CBC's English-language television network CBC Television
List of assets owned by Canadian Broadcasting Corporation
List of defunct CBC and Radio-Canada television transmitters - decommissioned on July 31, 2012

References